Klodian Gjino (born 13 February 1994) is an Albanian professional footballer who plays as a midfielder for Panionios.

References

External links

1994 births
Living people
Sportspeople from Berat
Albanian emigrants to Greece
Association football midfielders
Albanian footballers
Albania youth international footballers
Albania under-21 international footballers
Olympiacos F.C. players
Fostiras F.C. players
Aris Thessaloniki F.C. players
Panargiakos F.C. players
Kalamata F.C. players
Panachaiki F.C. players
Apollon Smyrnis F.C. players
Football League (Greece) players
Albanian expatriate footballers
Albanian expatriate sportspeople in Greece
Expatriate footballers in Greece